Ypsolopha tsugae is a moth of the family Ypsolophidae. It is known from Japan and Russia.

The wingspan is 10–11 mm.

The larvae feed on Tsuga diversifolia and Abies sachalinensis.

References

Ypsolophidae
Moths of Japan
Moths of Asia